Basilio Zanchi ( – 1558) was a 16th-century Italian humanist and scholar.

Zanchi was born in Bergamo. He wrote his poetry in Latin and was a canon in Letran and later a Vatican librarian.

He was imprisoned in Rome because he disobeyed the Pope Paul VI, probably because he accepted some Protestantism theories. He died at Castel Sant'Angelo.

Works
De Horto Sophiæ, 1540
Poematum libri VIII, 1550
Verborum latinorum ex variis auctoribus Epitome, 1541
Dictionarium poeticum, 1542
In divinos libros Notationes, 1556.

Sources 
 
 

Italian male writers
16th-century Italian writers
Vatican City writers
People associated with the Vatican Library
1500s births
1558 deaths
Italian Renaissance humanists